The 1862 Pacific Northwest smallpox epidemic was a smallpox outbreak that started in Victoria on Vancouver Island and spread among the indigenous peoples of the Pacific Northwest Coast and into the indigenous peoples of the Northwest Plateau, killing a large portion of natives from the Puget Sound region to Southeast Alaska. Two-thirds of British Columbia natives died—around 20,000 people.
The death rate was highest in southeast Alaska and Haida Gwaii—over 70% among the Haida and 60% among the Tlingit. Almost all native nations along the coast, and many in the interior, were devastated, with a death rate of over 50% for the entire coast from Puget Sound to Sitka, Alaska, part of Russian America at the time. In some areas the native population fell by as much as 90%. The disease was controlled among colonists in 1862 but it continued to spread among natives through 1863.

While colonial authorities used quarantine, smallpox vaccine, and inoculation to keep the disease from spreading among colonists and settlers, it was largely allowed to spread among indigenous peoples. The Colony of Vancouver Island made attempts to save some natives, but most were forced to leave the vicinity of Victoria and go back to their homelands, despite awareness that it could result in a major smallpox epidemic among natives along the Pacific Northwest coast. Many colonists and newspapers were vocally in favor of expulsion. The situation in the Puget Sound region was similar, with newspapers encouraging settlers to get vaccinated, but with little effort towards protecting natives. Most papers supported removing natives. The effect of the epidemic in the Puget Sound area is not well documented and it appears it did not spread south beyond the Chehalis people of the Chehalis River area.

Some historians have described it as a deliberate genocide because the Colony of Vancouver Island and the Colony of British Columbia could have prevented the epidemic but chose not to, and in some ways facilitated it. According to historian Kiran van Rijn, "opportunistic self-interest, coupled with hollow pity, revulsion at the victims, and smug feelings of inevitability, shaped the colonial response to the epidemic among First Nations". And that for some residents of Victoria the eviction of native people was a "long-sought opportunity" to be rid of them and, for some, an opportunity to take over First Nation lands. Some natives believed that the epidemic was being spread deliberately for the purpose of stealing their land.

Pacific Northwest indigenous peoples experienced several earlier smallpox epidemics, about once per generation after European contact began in the late 18th century: in the late 1770s, 1801-03, 1836-38, and 1853. These epidemics are not as well documented in historical records.

Introduction and spread of smallpox
Smallpox was brought to Victoria by the ship Brother Jonathan, which carried 350 passengers from San Francisco. The population of Victoria at the time was about 4,000 colonists and slightly more indigenous people from all over the Pacific Northwest coast camped nearby. There were several large semi-permanent native camps around Victoria at the time. The largest, known as the "Northern Encampment", had been in place since the gold rush of 1858 and was populated by northern coastal natives, especially Tsimshian, Haida, Tlingit, Heiltsuk, and Kwakwakaʼwakw. There were also Songhees villages and other natives from nearby areas, including Halkomelem and Wakashan speaking peoples, such as the Sto:lo and Nuu-chah-nulth.

Brother Jonathan arrived at Victoria on 12 March 1862. The ship left the next day. On 18 March The Daily British Colonist reported one passenger had the disease. A second case was reported on 19 March. By 22 March this second infected person was in the Lower Mainland at New Westminster, having traveled across the Strait of Georgia on the Otter. On 24 March another vessel from San Francisco, the Oregon arrived with at least one passenger infected with smallpox. California was struggling with smallpox at the time, but vaccinations and other preventative measures had kept the death toll relatively low.

Response
In late March the paper The Daily British Colonist published the first of several articles calling upon the government to take action, including quarantine and vaccination, to control the spread of smallpox among colonists as well as native people camped near Victoria. By 1 April about half of the colonists in Victoria had been vaccinated. On the same day the first infected native was reported. It is unclear how large a supply of the smallpox vaccine was available. Some sources stated that there was a shortage of vaccines. During May, 3,400 Indians along the lower Fraser River were reportedly vaccinated, as were others, in Puget Sound and the Strait of Georgia. These groups avoided much deaths from the epidemic. 

Governor James Douglas enlisted Hudson's Bay Company physician Dr. John Helmcken to vaccinate the Songhees. Little was done to prevent smallpox from spreading to the other natives encamped near Victoria. Two missionaries tended to the sick at the Northern Encampment and asked for government assistance. The colonial police commissioner, Augustus Pemberton, said the colony had no authority to interfere or even help bury the dead. On 28 April the Daily British Colonist called upon the government to "remove...the entire Indian population" from the Victoria area. Pemberton, with Governor Douglas's permission, ordered the Tsimshians to leave within one day, had a gunboat stationed to enforce the order, and placed armed guards around Victoria to prevent natives from entering.

Most of the Tsimshians left on 1 May, along with a number of Haida and Tlingit. However during May the epidemic continued to ravage the natives still living in the Northern Encampment. Many moved to other nearby camps. The Haida set up a large camp at Cadboro Bay. In early May two gunboats arrived, HMS Grappler and HMS Forward. On 11 May Police Commissioner Pemberton brought the gunboats and many policemen to Cadboro Bay. They forced about 300 natives to evacuate in 26 canoes. One of the gunboats towed the canoes. When the Cadboro Bay camp was empty the police went to what remained of the Northern Encampment and burned all the dwellings, leaving about 200 Haidas with no canoes. On 13 May the Daily British Colonist reported that these Haida were to be evicted "to one of the islands in the Straits—there to rot and die with the loathsome disease which is now destroying the poor wretches at the rate of six each day." Police efforts to drive the natives away from Victoria continued through late May, as small groups still remained near Victoria. Reports of natives dying of smallpox near Victoria continued into June. The number of native deaths near Victoria in 1862 is not known, but on 11 June newspapers reported about 1,000 to 1,200 unburied Northern Indian corpses just west of Victoria.

In April, when the outbreak was just starting, Dr. Helmcken vaccinated about 500 Songhees. On 29 April the Songhees abandoned their villages and moved to Discovery Island in Haro Strait. Due to this and Dr. Helmcken's vaccines the Songhees survived the epidemic with few deaths.

Most of the Halkomelem-speaking people of the Lower Mainland were saved due to the vaccination efforts of missionaries. The Catholic Oblate missionary Leon Fouquet and his partner Father Pandosy vaccinated a large number Halkomelem peoples such as the Cowichan Quwutsun, as well as some members of other groups like the Squamish and Shishalh. Fourquet also sent a large supply of vaccine to Casimir Chirouse at Tulalip. Chirouse vaccinated most of the Tulalip and Nooksack people. In August, when smallpox arrived in the Puget Sound area the Tulalip and Nooksack were mostly safe, while other native groups were devastated. The Anglican missionary John Good vaccinated the Snuneymuxw.

Some Hudson's Bay Company officials took part in vaccination efforts, such as Hamilton Moffat who vaccinated over 100 natives near Fort Rupert, and William Manson who vaccinated "a large number" at Fort Kamloops. Despite Manson's efforts he reported "violent outbreaks" of smallpox in the Kamloops area. Some natives attempted to inoculate themselves, although how many and how effective it was is not known.

Spread to the north
Starting in May 1862, thousands of infected natives were evicted from the Victoria area and forced to return to their homes in the north, all along the coast from Nanaimo to the Stikine River in southeast Alaska. Unlike the region around the Salish Sea the northern coast had little previous exposure to smallpox and no vaccines available. As the disease spread indigenous peoples suffered devastating losses. There are no first-hand accounts of the initial stages of the epidemic in the north. By mid-June Victoria newspapers began receiving reports of the toll the disease was taking. The Pentlatch, Eeksen, and Qualicom peoples were greatly reduced and merged with the K'ómoks (Comox). Although a few Shishalh people had been vaccinated the nation as a whole was devastated.

Many Kwakwakaʼwakw lived near Fort Rupert, on northern Vancouver Island. Over the summer of 1862 various ships reported high death tolls. The disease reduced the Kwakwakaʼwakw population by over 50%. Likewise there were harrowing reports about the Heiltsuk people of the Bella Bella area. On 18 July 1862 the Daily British Colonist reported that smallpox had killed about 60% of the Heiltsuk people. Robert Boyd estimates the Heiltsuk population fell by about 72% due to the epidemic. Many villages were abandoned and survivors soon moved to the consolidated settlement at Bella Bella. Large areas of traditional Heiltsuk territory were abandoned. By 1899 the Heiltsuk population had dropped to 319, almost all at Bella Bella. The Nuxalk people were also decimated by smallpox, with a loss of about 58%, and a similar abandonment of villages and whole regions, with consolidation at Bella Coola.

The Haida people suffered the most from the smallpox epidemic. Haida Gwaii experienced a large amount of village abandonment and consolidation. No contemporary accounts describe what happened when the first infected Haida returned, but later reports suggest that smallpox circulated among Haida villages for over a year killing about 72% of the Haida people. Many historic Haida villages were abandoned in the years following the epidemic, including Ninstints, Kloo, Skedans, Cumshewa, Dadens, Haina, Hiellen, Kung, Klinkwan, and "Old" Kasaan, among others. Survivors consolidated in four main settlements: Skidegate, Masset, Hydaburg, and "New" Kasaan.

The Tsimshian forced away from Victoria brought smallpox to Fort Simpson, whence it spread widely starting in June 1862. By early July the native settlement outside the fort was deserted due to deaths and people fleeing the area. The Tsimshian settlement at Metlakatla had only just been founded by the missionary William Duncan, who intended it to be a utopian Christian community. Duncan was able to quarantine Metlakatla by refusing to allow natives to be admitted who showed any signs of smallpox. His efforts resulted in Metlakatla being mostly spared from the disease. Duncan also used the epidemic to proselytize, saying that the epidemic had been sent by God as a punishment for the sins of the Tsimshian, and that those who repented and "came to Jesus" and were baptized would be spared. Duncan also recorded news about the spread of the disease up the Skeena River, and elsewhere, as refugees sought entrance to Metlakatla.

Tlingits driven from Victoria brought smallpox to the Stikine River area. Some of the refugees were escorted by the gunboat HMS Topaz all the way from Victoria to Alaska. No records survive of the situation in the Stikine area during July and August, when the epidemic was likely at its height. In early September HMS Devastation visited the area and noted major population loss and the continuing spread of smallpox. The epidemic spread north into the Alexander Archipelago but was limited due to an extensive Russian vaccination program. Some Tlingit groups had not been part of the Russian program and these were decimated by the disease, especially the Henya Tlingit of northern Prince of Wales island. The Mainland Tlingit suffered losses of about 60%, and the Island Tlingit about 37%.

Other indigenous peoples who suffered major population loss include the Saanich (about 72%), Nisga'a (about 37%), Gitxsan (about 22%), Sabassas or Kitkatla Tsimshian (about 67%), Wuikinuxv (Oweekeno), as well as the interior nations of the Nlaka'pamux, Stʼatʼimc, Dakelh, Tsilhqotʼin, and Secwepemc, among others.

Aftermath
Up until the 1862–1863 epidemic, the colonial authorities acquired indigenous land through treaties. Governor James Douglas had signed 14 land cession treaties on Vancouver Island, known as the Douglas Treaties. In 1864, after the epidemic, the colony's Chief Commissioner of Land and Works Joseph Trutch decided to stop recognizing indigenous title and abandon the treaty process. This set the precedent of British Columbia taking indigenous land by fiat rather than treaty.

The large population losses also caused widespread native village abandonment and consolidation, cultural loss, increased conflict and hostility with colonists. In Haida Gwaii, following the 1862 epidemic, over nineteen villages diminished to four by the early 20th century.

The Tsilhqotʼin people resisted when a wagon road began to be built through their territory without permission, resulting in the Chilcotin War. One of the foremen of the road-building project threatened the Tsilhqotʼin with smallpox. The war ended with the hanging of six Tsilhqotʼin chiefs. In 2014, British Columbia Premier Christy Clark formally exonerated the executed chiefs and apologized for these acts, acknowledging that "there is an indication [that smallpox] was spread intentionally."

See also
 List of epidemics
 Population history of indigenous peoples of the Americas
 Native American disease and epidemics
 1837 Great Plains smallpox epidemic
 Smallpox Bay
 Fraser Canyon Gold Rush

References

Further reading
 
 

1862 disease outbreaks
1862 in Canada
1862 disasters in Canada
19th-century epidemics
Disasters in British Columbia
Disease outbreaks in Canada
Disease outbreaks in the United States
First Nations history
First Nations history in British Columbia
Genocides in North America
History of British Columbia
Native American genocide
Native American history
Smallpox epidemics
History of Victoria, British Columbia
History of Vancouver Island
1862 natural disasters in the United States